Carlo Forlivesi (born 23 October 1971) is an Italian composer, performer and researcher.

Forlivesi was born in Faenza, Emilia-Romagna. He studied at Bologna Conservatory, Milan Conservatory and the Accademia Nazionale di Santa Cecilia of  Rome. He then joined IRCAM (Institute de Recherche et Coordination Acoustique/Musique) and subsequently DIEM (Danish Institute of Electroacoustic Music), Tokyo College of Music, and Northwestern University, with fellowships from the governments of Italy, Denmark, Japan, and the United States (Fulbright Commission).

His activity has mainly focused on new music in Europe, the United States, and Japan. Forlivesi has conducted extensive research in the field of traditional Japanese music and dance including the ethnic music of the Ainu. Beside contemporary music, he cultivates a particular interest in early music, which he studied and performed for several years.

Forlivesi has collaborated with first-class performers and received numerous awards. His music is regularly programmed by festivals and theatres worldwide. Several times nominated artist-in-residence, lecturer, workshop coach, and music–contest judge, Forlivesi's international stance is reflected in his eclectic output, which includes compositions for orchestra, choir, chamber music, dance, electronics, and traditional Japanese instruments as well as choreographies and written works.

He has been a lecturer at Sapporo University, and an AFAM professor at the Italian State Conservatories of Cagliari, Adria, Modena and Rodi.

Discography
Monograph
 Carlo Forlivesi: Silenziosa Luna – 沈黙の月 / ALM Records ALCD-76 (2008)
 Carlo Forlivesi: Compositions / Tactus TC.970601 (2019)

External links
  Carlo Forlivesi Official Website
  Staatliche Hochschule für Musik und Darstellende Kunst Stuttgart – Carlo Forlivesi
  CEMAT, Rome – Carlo Forlivesi
  SIMC – ISCM International Society for Contemporary Music – Carlo Forlivesi
  CDMC, Paris – Carlo Forlivesi
  Fulbright Visiting Scholar Directory – Music
 THE TRADITIONAL MUSIC OF THE AINU – NEW APPROACHES AND FINDINGS Journal of Comparative Cultures – NO. 16. Sapporo University 2005, by Carlo Forlivesi

1971 births
Living people
People from Faenza
20th-century classical composers
21st-century classical composers
Conservatorio Giovanni Battista Martini alumni
Italian classical composers
Italian male classical composers
Postmodern composers
Electroacoustic music composers
Ethnomusicologists
Accademia Nazionale di Santa Cecilia alumni
20th-century Italian composers
20th-century Italian male musicians
21st-century Italian male musicians